Frida: 4×CD 1×DVD is a boxed set compilation album by Swedish singer Anni-Frid Lyngstad, better known as Frida, released on 5 December 2005 by Polar Music. This box set contains her solo albums, Frida ensam, Something's Going On, Shine, and Djupa andetag (Deep Breaths) and a DVD documentary film, Frida: The DVD.

History
This idea was conceived by Marie Ledin, daughter of Stig Anderson, who worked with Anderson Records, who stated that "the idea that we should make a DVD came from a Frida fan from the beginning." Ledin spoke to Mårten Aglander, managing director of Universal Sweden, and Lyngstad about the documentary and the compilation. As Lyngstad turned 60 years old at that time in 2005, Ledin thought it would be a good idea to "do the DVD and also do a box set with the Polar [Music] albums." Thus, it was made, with Lyngstad's permission, and meticulous research done by Ledin for the documentary, Frida – The DVD.

Content
Frida: The DVD contains television clips of Lyngstad's performances prior to ABBA, two documentaries about the making of Something's Going On, and Djupa andetag, which was part of the documentary special, Frida – Mitt I Livet, both of which were produced by Sveriges Television. Frida: 4×CD 1×DVD also includes its accompanying music videos from her career's time periods, and her exclusive interview in Zermatt; which featured Lyngstad talking about her personal life, career, personality, and encounters with celebrities such as Lasse Berghagen, and Phil Collins, as well as including her three solo albums with Polar Music and her only album with Anderson Records, Djupa andetag.

Track listing

Frida ensam
<LI>"Fernando" (Stig (Stikkan) Anderson, Benny Andersson, Björn Ulvaeus) - 4:14
<LI>"Jag är mig själv nu" ("Young Girl") (Jerry Fuller, Marie Bergman) - 3:05
<LI>"Som en sparv" (Jan Askelind, Barbro Hörberg) - 3:43
<LI>"Vill du låna en man?" ("The Most Beautiful Girl") (Norris Wilson, Rory Michael Bourke, Billy Sherrill, Anderson) - 2:45
<LI>"Liv på Mars?" ("Life on Mars?") (David Bowie, Owe Junsjö) - 3:48
<LI>"Syrtaki" ("Siko Chorepse Syrtaki") (Giorgos Zambetas, Alekos Sakellarios, Sam Lundwall) - 2:58
<LI>"Aldrig mej" ("Vado Via") (Enrico Riccardi, Luigi Albertelli, Anderson) - 4:06
<LI>"Guld och gröna ängar" ("The Wall Street Shuffle") (Eric Stewart, Graham Gouldman, Junsjö) - 3:41
<LI>"Ett liv i solen" ("Anima Mia") (Flavio Paulin, Ivano Michetti, Mats Paulson) - 3:53
<LI>"Skulle de' va' skönt" ("Wouldn't It Be Nice") (Brian Wilson, Tony Asher, Marie Bergman) - 3:17
<LI>"Var är min clown?" ("Send in the Clowns") (Stephen Sondheim, Mats Paulson) - 4:22
<LI>"Man vill ju leva lite dessemellan" ("Chi Salta Il Fosso") (Vittorio Tariciotti, Marcello Marrocchi, Franca Evangelisti, Anderson) - 2:53
<LI>"Ska man skratta eller gråta?" ("Principessa") (Gianfranco Baldazzi, Sergio Bardotti, Rosalino Cellamare, Anderson) - 3:51

Something's Going On
"Tell Me It's Over" (Stephen Bishop) – 2:52
"I See Red" (Jim Rafferty) – 4:33
"I Got Something" (Tomas Ledin) – 4:04
"Strangers" (Jayne Bradbury, Dave Morris) – 4:06
"To Turn the Stone" (Pete Bellotte, Giorgio Moroder) – 5:26
"I Know There's Something Going On" (Russ Ballard) – 5:29
"Threnody" (Per Gessle, Dorothy Parker) – 4:17
"Baby Don't You Cry No More" (Rod Argent) – 3:02
"The Way You Do" (Bryan Ferry) – 3:38
"You Know What I Mean" (Phil Collins) – 2:37
"Here We'll Stay" (duet with Phil Collins) (Tony Colton, Jean Roussel) – 4:03
"I Know There's Something Going On (Single Edit)" (Ballard) – 4:07
"Here We'll Stay" (Solo Version) (Colton, Roussel) – 4:11

Shine
 "Shine" (Kevin Jarvis, Guy Fletcher, Jeremy Bird) – 4:39
 "One Little Lie" (Simon Climie, Kirsty MacColl) – 3:44
 "The Face" (Daniel Balavoine, Kirsty MacColl) – 3:40
 "Twist In The Dark" (Andee Leek) – 3:43
 "Slowly" (Björn Ulvaeus, Benny Andersson) – 4:34
 "Heart Of The Country" (Stuart Adamson)– 4:38
 "Come To Me (I Am Woman)" (Eddie Howell, David Dundas) – 5:04
 "Chemistry Tonight" (Pete Glenister, Simon Climie, Kirsty MacColl) – 4:56
 "Don't Do It" (Anni-Frid Lyngstad) – 4:37
 "Comfort Me" (Pete Glenister) – 4:28
"That's Tough" (Anni-Frid Lyngstad, Hans Fredriksson, Kirsty MacColl) - 5:03
"Shine" (Extended Mix) (Kevin Jarvis, Guy Fletcher, Jeremy Bird) - 6:31

Djupa andetag

See also 
Frida: The DVD
Frida 1967–1972
 Anni-Frid Lyngstad discography
ABBA discography

References

Anni-Frid Lyngstad albums
2005 compilation albums
Polar Music albums
Anni-Frid Lyngstad compilation albums
Swedish-language compilation albums
Albums produced by Phil Collins
Albums produced by Steve Lillywhite
Albums produced by Anders Glenmark
Albums produced by Benny Andersson
Albums produced by Björn Ulvaeus
Albums recorded at Polar Studios